The 2017–18 Campeonato Nacional de Futebol Feminino (also known as Liga de Futebol Feminino Allianz for sponsorship reasons) was the 33rd edition of Campeonato Nacional de Futebol Feminino. Sporting CP successfully defended their title, winning the competition for the 2nd time.

Teams 

Twelve teams competed in the league – the top ten teams from the 2016–17 Campeonato Nacional, as well as two teams promoted from the Campeonato de Promoção.

As the competition was reduced from 14 to 12 teams, only two teams were promoted to replace the four teams relegated:
 Atlético Ouriense, Viseu 2001, Belenenses and Pontinha were the teams relegated, finishing 11th, 12th, 13th and 14th, respectively.
 Quintajense, the winner of the Campeonato de Promoção, and Cadima, the runner-up, were the teams promoted.

Stadia and locations

Personnel and kits

Season Summary

League table

Results

Notes

References

External links
official website (fpf)

2017-18
Por
women's
Camp|